On 23 March 2020, Islamists carried out massacres of soldiers in Chad and Nigeria.

Attack on Bohama camp 
Starting at 5am, Boko Haram gunmen attacked Bohama military camp on an island in Lake Chad. The attack took place from four sides, attacking with about 400 soldiers. The jihadists overran the camp after seven hours of fighting. Reinforcement were sent from the town of Kaïga Kindjiria to relive the stricken camp but got stuck and were ambushed. In total 98 Chadian soldiers were killed, 47 wounded, and 24 vehicles destroyed.

Gorgi ambush 
In the evening, insurgents with rocket-propelled grenades and other heavy weaponry ambushed an army lorry and incinerated it, killing about 70 Nigerian soldiers, in Gorgi, a village in Borno State in the northeast of the country. Several other soldiers were injured and some others kidnapped. The lorry was part of a convoy which was travelling from Maiduguri to an ISIL camp.

References

2020 murders in Nigeria
2020 murders in Africa
March 2020 crimes in Africa
2020s massacres in Nigeria
Mass murder in 2020
Mass murder in Borno State
Terrorist incidents in Borno State
Terrorist incidents in Nigeria in 2020